George McQueen (29 December 1895 – 3 November 1951) was a Scottish footballer who played as a left back.

He began his career with Rangers, winning the Scottish Football League title in his first season, 1917–18, but found it difficult to remain in the team and served short loans with four clubs before being released in 1921. He signed for Airdrieonians and was immediately an important member of the side as they became one of the strongest in Scotland, finishing runners-up in the league for four seasons in succession and winning the Scottish Cup in 1924, McQueen lifting the trophy as captain. He remained with the Diamonds as a regular until retiring in 1933, aged 38, having made over 400 appearances overall and scored more than 30 goals from penalties and free-kicks, in which he specialised.

McQueen was selected for the Scottish Football League XI once in 1925 and travelled with the Scotland team as reserve defender in two occasions, but never received a full international cap.

References

1895 births
1951 deaths
Scottish footballers
Larkhall Thistle F.C. players
Parkhead F.C. players
Scottish Junior Football Association players
St Mirren F.C. players
Partick Thistle F.C. players
Kilmarnock F.C. players
Scottish Football League players
Third Lanark A.C. players
Airdrieonians F.C. (1878) players
Rangers F.C. players
Scottish Football League representative players
Association football defenders
Footballers from South Lanarkshire